Keckiella antirrhinoides (formerly Penstemon antirrhinoides) is a species of flowering shrub in the plantain family known by the common names snapdragon penstemon and chaparral beardtongue.

It is native to the Mojave Desert and Sonoran Deserts of California, Arizona, and northern Baja California. It is also found in the chaparral—Colorado Desert ecotone of the Peninsular Ranges.

Description
Keckiella antirrhinoides is desert shrub that grows one half to two and a half meters tall, with spreading branches.

The oppositely-arranged leaves are up to 2 centimeters long and are lance-shaped or narrow ovals. They are deciduous during dry periods.

The plant produces branchlike inflorescences which bear snapdragon-like flowers. Each hairy, glandular flower is about 2 centimeters wide, with three lower lobes which lie flat or curve down and two upper lobes which join to form a curved lip. Inside the flower are shiny filamentous stamens holding anthers and a flat, densely hairy sterile stamen called a staminode. The flowers are light yellow and dry to nearly black.

External links

Jepson Manual Treatment
Photo gallery

antirrhinoides
Flora of Arizona
Flora of Baja California
Flora of California
Flora of the California desert regions
Flora of the Sonoran Deserts
Natural history of the California chaparral and woodlands
Natural history of the Colorado Desert
Natural history of the Mojave Desert
Natural history of the Peninsular Ranges
Flora without expected TNC conservation status